Fábio Miguel Amendoeira Ervões (born 26 February 1987) is a Portuguese former professional footballer who played as a centre back.

Club career
Born in Valpaços, Vila Real District, Ervões played youth football for four clubs, including FC Porto from ages 16–19. He alternated between the second and third divisions in his first years as a senior, starting out at S.C. Esmoriz.

Ervões made his debut as a professional on 21 September 2008, coming on as a late substitute to help S.C. Covilhã to a 2–1 away win against U.D. Oliveirense. In summer 2012, he signed for fellow league club F.C. Penafiel. He was sent off in his first official appearance of the 2013–14 season, a 2–0 victory over Leixões S.C. in the domestic League Cup, but ended up contributing 30 league matches and one goal as the team returned to the Primeira Liga after a lengthy absence.

References

External links

1987 births
Living people
People from Valpaços
Portuguese footballers
Association football defenders
Primeira Liga players
Liga Portugal 2 players
Segunda Divisão players
Padroense F.C. players
FC Porto players
S.C. Covilhã players
C.F. União players
F.C. Penafiel players
Boavista F.C. players
F.C. Vizela players
Portugal youth international footballers
Sportspeople from Vila Real District